is an upcoming Japanese animated film written and directed by Hayao Miyazaki and produced by Studio Ghibli. It is inspired by the 1937 novel of the same name by Genzaburo Yoshino, but has an original story that is not a direct adaptation of the novel. It has been described as a "big fantastical film". Distributed by Toho, the film will be released in Japan on July 14, 2023.

Premise
The film centers around how the real-world novel How Do You Live? features prominently in the protagonist's life.

Production
Following the release of The Wind Rises, Hayao Miyazaki held a press conference in Venice in September 2013 announcing his retirement, saying: "I know I've said I would retire many times in the past. Many of you must think, 'Once again.' But this time I am quite serious." 
However, Miyazaki later changed his mind and decided to come out of retirement to direct another film. He commenced animation work in July 2016, later confirmed by studio executive Toshio Suzuki. With Miyazaki coming out of retirement, Studio Ghibli reopened with many of its past collaborators working on the project. In October 2017, Studio Ghibli announced the film would be titled How Do You Live?. Toshio Suzuki said that Miyazaki is working on the film for his grandson as his way of saying "Grandpa is moving onto the next world soon but he is leaving behind this film". The film was at one point considered to be released around the time of the 2020 Summer Olympics.

Suzuki stated in August 2018 that the film was expected to be completed in 2021 or 2022. In a late 2019 interview with NHK, Miyazaki stated that the film is not to be expected anytime soon; he said that in his younger age, he used to produce 10 minutes of animation every month, but now his speed was reduced to 1 minute per month. As of October 2019, the film was confirmed to be 15% complete. In May 2020, Suzuki described to Entertainment Weekly that it was a "big fantastical" film, while also telling them that 60 animators were working on the film and that an estimated 36 minutes had been completed after three years of production, saying "we are still hand-drawing everything, but it takes us more time to complete a film because we're drawing more frames", and they were "hoping it will finish in the next three years". In December 2020, Suzuki stated that the production was working with no deadlines, similarly to The Tale of the Princess Kaguya (2013), which took eight years to make. He said that the animation was half-finished, that production was running faster due to COVID-19 restrictions requiring them to work at home, and that the film would be 125 minutes long. He also revealed that Miyazaki wanted to adapt Earwig and the Witch (2020) during development, but his son Goro directed the adaptation instead. 
On December 13, 2022, Toho announced it will release the film in Japanese cinemas on July 14, 2023.

References

External links
 How Do You Live? at Toho (in Japanese)
 
 

2023 anime films
Anime films based on novels
Films directed by Hayao Miyazaki
Films set in Japan
Studio Ghibli animated films
Toho animated films
Upcoming films